Carol Channing (January 31, 1921 – January 15, 2019) was an American actress, singer, dancer, comedian, and voice artist. She won the Golden Globe Award and was nominated for the Academy Award for Best Supporting Actress for her performance as Muzzy Van Hossmere in Thoroughly Modern Millie (1967). Other film appearances include The First Traveling Saleslady (1956) and Skidoo (1968). On television she has made many appearances as an entertainer on variety shows, from The Ed Sullivan Show in the 1950s to Hollywood Squares. She is also known for her performance as The White Queen in a 1985 production of Alice in Wonderland.

On television, Channing appeared on numerous television shows beginning in the early 1950s. Her husband at the time produced the Burns and Allen comedy show, which starred George Burns and Gracie Allen. When Allen was forced to discontinue performing due to medical problems, Lowe asked Channing to take over Allen's role. Since the late 1950s she worked on and off with Burns, who appeared with her in 1966 on the TV special, An Evening with Carol Channing.

She had guest appearances on sitcoms and talk shows, including What's My Line?, where she appeared in 11 episodes from 1962 to 1966. Channing did voice-over work in cartoons, most notably as Grandmama in an animated version of The Addams Family from 1992-95. On Sesame Street in 1986 she sang a parody of the song "Hello, Dolly!" called "Hello, Sammy!", as a love song to Sammy the Snake. In 1993, she poked a little fun at herself in an episode of The Nanny.

Filmography

Film

Television

Discography

Cast recordings and soundtracks
 Gentlemen Prefer Blondes, Columbia Records, 1950
 archy and mehitabel: a back-alley opera (with Eddie Bracken), Columbia, 1954
 Show Girl, Roulette Records, 1961
 Hello, Dolly!, RCA Records, 1964
 Thoroughly Modern Millie, Decca Records, 1967
 Lorelei, Decca, 1974
 Hello, Dolly! revival, Varèse Sarabande, 1994

Studio albums and live recordings
 Carol Channing, Vanguard Records, 1961
 Carol Channing Entertains, Command Records, 1965
 C and W (with Webb Pierce), Plantation Records, 1976
 Kidding Around with Carol Channing and the Kids, Caedmon, 1976
 Carol Channing and Her Country Friends (with Jimmy C. Newman, Hank Locklin, and others), Plantation Records, 1977
 Carol Channing on Tour, 51 West Records, 1980
 Jazz Baby, DRG Records. 1994
 For Heaven's Sake, New Day Records, 2010
 True to the Red, White, and Blue, Homesick Entertainment, 2012

Spoken word and audiobooks
 Madeline and Other Bemelmans told by Carol Channing, Caedmon Records, 1959
 Gentlemen Prefer Blondes (Lorelei's Diary), Caedmon, 1962
 Carol Channing reads and sings: Roland the Minstrel Pig ; Loudmouse ; Tom, Sue, and the Clock ; The "B" Book, Caedmon, 1969
 The Year Without a Santa Claus read by Carol Channing, Caedmon, 1969
 Carol Channing reads Madeline and the Gypsies, Caedmon, 1970
 Winnie-The-Pooh told and sung by Carol Channing, Caedmon, 1972
 Peter and the Wolf and Tubby the Tuba, Caedmon, 1979
  Carol Channing reads The Purple Cow, Caedmon, 1981
 The House at Pooh Corner told and sung by Carol Channing, Caedmon, 1981
 Carol Channing Sings the Pooh Song Book, Caedmon, 1983
 Winnie-the-Pooh and Christopher Robin told and sung by Carol Channing, Caedmon, 1984 
 Just Lucky, I Guess: A Memoir of Sorts, 2017

References

External links
 
 

Channing, Carol
Channing, Carol